Marcia Angell (born April 20, 1939) is an American physician, author, and the first woman to serve as editor-in-chief of the New England Journal of Medicine. She is currently a Senior Lecturer in the Department of Global Health and Social Medicine at Harvard Medical School in Boston, Massachusetts.

Biography
After completing undergraduate studies in chemistry and mathematics at James Madison University in Harrisonburg, Virginia, Angell spent a year as a Fulbright Scholar studying microbiology in Frankfurt, Germany. After receiving her M.D. from Boston University School of Medicine in 1967, Angell trained in both internal medicine and anatomic pathology and is a board-certified pathologist.

Angell is a frequent contributor to both medical journals and the popular media on a wide range of topics, particularly medical ethics, health policy, the nature of medical evidence, the interface of medicine and the law, and end-of-life healthcare. Her book, Science on Trial: The Clash of Medical Evidence and the Law in the Breast Implant Case (1996) received critical acclaim. With Stanley Robbins and, later, Vinay Kumar, she coauthored the first three editions of the textbook Basic Pathology. She has written chapters in several books dealing with ethical issues in medicine and healthcare.

Angell is a member of the Association of American Physicians, the Institute of Medicine of the National Academy of Sciences, the Alpha Omega Alpha National Honor Medical Society, and is a Master of the American College of Physicians. She is also a fellow of the Committee for the Scientific Investigation of Claims of the Paranormal and is an outspoken critic of medical quackery and the promotion of alternative medicine.

New England Journal of Medicine tenure 
Angell joined the editorial staff of The New England Journal of Medicine (NEJM) in 1979. She became Executive Editor in 1988, and served as interim Editor-in-Chief from 1999 until June 2000. The NEJM is the oldest continuously published medical journal, and one of the most prestigious; Angell is the first woman to have served as Editor-in-Chief of the journal since it was founded in 1812.

In 1999, Jerome P. Kassirer, M.D. resigned as NEJM's Editor-in-Chief following a dispute with the journal's publisher, the Massachusetts Medical Society, over the Society's plan to use the journal's name to brand and market other sources of healthcare information. Angell agreed to serve as interim Editor-in-Chief until a permanent editor would be chosen. She reached an agreement with the society that the Editor-in-Chief would have authority over usage of the journal's name and logo, and that the journal's name would not be used on other products. Angell was a finalist for the permanent post of Editor-in-Chief, but withdrew as a candidate explaining she was retiring to write a book on alternative medicine. Angell retired from the journal in June 2000 and was replaced by Jeffrey Drazen, M.D.

Positions

Criticism of conflicts of interest and biases in the medical establishment 

In her 2009 article "Drug Companies & Doctors: A Story of Corruption", published in The New York Review of Books magazine, Angell wrote :

Criticism of the Food and Drug Administration 

Commenting on the 1992 Prescription Drug User Fee Act which allowed the Food and Drug Administration (FDA) to collect fees from drug manufacturers to fund the new drug approval process, Angell has stated :

Criticism of U.S. healthcare system 

Angell has long been a critic of the U.S. healthcare system. The American healthcare system is in serious crisis, she stated in a 2000 PBS special: "If we had set out to design the worst system that we could imagine, we couldn't have imagined one as bad as we have." In the PBS interview, she urges the nation to scrap its failing healthcare system and start over:

Criticism of the pharmaceutical industry 

Angell is a critic of the pharmaceutical industry. With Arnold S. Relman, she argues, "The few drugs that are truly innovative have usually been based on taxpayer-supported research done in nonprofit academic medical centers or at the National Institutes of Health. In fact, many drugs now sold by drug companies were licensed to them by academic medical centers or small biotechnology companies." The pharmaceutical industry estimates that each new drug costs them $800 million to develop and bring to market, but Angell and Relman estimate the cost to them is actually closer to $100 million. Angell is the author of The Truth About the Drug Companies: How They Deceive Us and What to Do About It.

In her 2004 article "The Truth About the Drug Companies", published in The New York Review of Books, Angell wrote :

Richard Friedman, director of the psychopharmacology clinic at Weill Cornell Medical College, and a regular contributor to the New York Times science pages, criticized Angell's views as unbalanced. "Dr. Angell is now doing pretty much the same thing the industry she assails has done, just the converse.  Pharma withheld the bad news about its drugs and touted the positive results; Dr. Angell ignores positive data that conflicts with her cherished theory and reports the negative results.”

Views on alternative medicine 

Marcia Angell is also a critic of the current categorization of alternative medicine. In a 1998 NEJM editorial she wrote with Jerome Kassirer, they argued:

 It is time for the scientific community to stop giving alternative medicine a free ride. There cannot be two kinds of medicine — conventional and alternative. There is only medicine that has been adequately tested and medicine that has not, medicine that works and medicine that may or may not work. Once a treatment has been tested rigorously, it no longer matters whether it was considered alternative at the outset. If it is found to be reasonably safe and effective, it will be accepted.

Awards and honors 
In 1997, Time magazine named Marcia Angell one of the 25 most influential Americans for that year.

Works
Basic Pathology 1st edition (1971, Robbins, Stanley Leonard; Angell, Marcia); 2nd ed. (1973, Robbins, S.L.; Angell, M.); 3rd ed. (1981, Robbins, S.L.; Angell, M. Kumar, Vinay)

References

External links 
 
 
 
 
 Quotes by Marcia Angell
 Angell article archive from The New York Review of Books
 

Physicians from Massachusetts
Harvard Medical School faculty
American medical writers
Women medical writers
James Madison University alumni
Boston University School of Medicine alumni
1939 births
Living people
The New England Journal of Medicine people
American skeptics
Critics of alternative medicine
People from Knoxville, Tennessee
American women physicians
Medical journal editors
American women academics
21st-century American women
Members of the National Academy of Medicine